{{Infobox martial artist
| name            = Matt Schnell
| nickname        = Danger
| birth_name      = Matthew Christopher Schnell
| birth_date      = 
| birth_place     = Amory, Mississippi, United States
| residence       = Shreveport, Louisiana, United States
| nationality     = American
| height          = 
| weight_lb       = 125
| weight_class    = FlyweightBantamweight
| reach_in        = 72+1/2
| style           = 
| rank            = Black belt in Karate  Purple belt in Brazilian Jiu-Jitsu
| stance          = 
| fighting_out_of = Shreveport, Louisiana, United States
| team            = American Top Team (2014–2017)  Combat Sports Academy (2017–present)  American Kickboxing Academy (2017–present)<ref>{{cite web|url=https://mmajunkie.usatoday.com/2019/11/ufc-busan-matt-schnell-expects-firewords-alexandre-pantoja|title=Matt Schnell on UFC Busan fight vs. Alexandre Pantoja: 'I either spark this kid, or it's 'Fight of the Night|author=Farah Hannoun|work=MMAjunkie.com|date=November 23, 2019}}</ref>
| trainer         = 
| years_active    = 2009–present
| mma_kowin       = 2
| mma_subwin      = 9
| mma_decwin      = 4
| mma_dqwin       = 1
| mma_koloss      = 4
| mma_subloss     = 2
| mma_decloss     = 1
| mma_draw        = 
| mma_nc          = 1
| url             = 
| sherdog         = 47006
| footnotes       =
| updated         =
}}

Matthew Christopher Schnell (born January 15, 1990) is an American professional mixed martial artist. He currently competes in the Flyweight division in the Ultimate Fighting Championship (UFC). Schnell formerly competed for Legacy Fighting Alliance, where he is a former Legacy Fighting Alliance Flyweight Champion. As of December 19, 2022, he is #8 in the UFC flyweight rankings.

 Mixed martial arts career

 Caged 
In 2012, Schnell was one of the young MMA fighters featured in Caged - an MTV reality television series.  The show focused on four prospective MMA fighters in small-town Louisiana.  Schnell was one of the two fighters on the show, alongside Tony Kelley, to later fight professionally.

 Legacy Fighting Championship 
Schnell joined Legacy Fighting Championship in 2012 and went 9–2 in various promotions before joining the cast of The Ultimate Fighter, season 24.

 The Ultimate Fighter: Tournament of Champions
On May 11, 2016, the UFC announced that the 16 contestants for The Ultimate Fighter: Tournament of Champions would be flyweight champion fighters from various organizations around the world, with the winner being expected to have a chance to fight for the flyweight title against Demetrious Johnson. Schnell was announced as part of the cast in July and selected for Team Cejudo.

In the first round on the show, Schnell seeded at #6 faced #11 Matt Rizzo and defeated him in the second round via a triangle choke submission. Schnell advanced to the quarterfinals and faced #3 seed Tim Elliott.  He lost the fight via first-round submission due to a bulldog choke.

Ultimate Fighting Championship
After his stint on The Ultimate Fighter, Schnell was chosen as one of the cast mates to get a contract. Schnell fought Rob Font in the bantamweight division at The Ultimate Fighter: Tournament of Champions Finale. He lost the fight via TKO in the first round.

Schnell returned to the flyweight division and faced Hector Sandoval on April 22, 2017, at UFC Fight Night: Swanson vs. Lobov. He lost the fight via knockout in the first round.

Schnell next fought on October 7, 2017 at UFC 216 against Marco Beltrán. He won the fight by unanimous decision.

Schnell faced Naoki Inoue on June 23, 2018 at UFC Fight Night 132. He won the fight via split decision.

Schnell faced Louis Smolka in a bantamweight bout on March 9, 2019 at UFC Fight Night 146. He won the fight via a triangle choke submission in the first round.

As the first fight of his new, four-fight contract, Schnell faced Jordan Espinosa on August 3, 2019 at UFC on ESPN 5. He won the fight via a triangle choke submission in the first round. The win also earned Schnell his first Performance of the Night bonus award.

Schnell faced Alexandre Pantoja on December 21, 2019 at UFC Fight Night 165. He lost the fight via first-round knockout.

Schnell was expected to face Tyson Nam on September 12, 2020 at UFC Fight Night 183. However, Schnell was removed from the fight on the day of the event's weigh-in for health issues related to his weight cut. As a result, the fight was cancelled. The bout with Nam was first rescheduled to UFC Fight Night: Thompson vs. Neal, on December 19, 2020, and then to UFC on ESPN: Chiesa vs. Magny, on January 20, 2021. He won the bout by split decision.

As the first fight of his new multi-fight contract, Schnell was scheduled to meet Alex Perez May 15, 2021 at UFC 262. However, Perez pulled out of the fight for undisclosed reasons and was replaced by Rogério Bontorin. At the weigh ins, Bontorin weighed in at 137 pounds, 1 pound over the bantamweight non-title fight limit. The bout proceeded at catchweight and Bontorin was fined 20% of his individual purse, which went to Schnell. Schnell lost the bout via unanimous decision.

The bout with Perez was rescheduled and was expected to take place on August 28, 2021 at UFC on ESPN: Barboza vs. Chikadze.  However, for undisclosed reason the bout was moved to UFC Fight Night: Brunson vs. Till. However, the bout was yet again postponed for unknown reasons to UFC 269. At the weigh-ins Alex Perez weighed in at 126.25 pounds, a quarter-pound over the flyweight non-title fight limit. Shortly after the weigh-ins, officials had announced that the bout had been cancelled due Schnell was forced to withdraw from the event due to a medical issue. The pair was rescheduled to UFC 271 on February 12, 2022. At weigh-ins, Perez came in at 128 pounds and did not attempt to try again, resulting in Matt Schnell refusing to take the catchweight bout and the bout being scrapped.

Schnell faced Brandon Royval on May 7, 2022 at UFC 274.  He lost the back-and-forth fight via a guillotine choke submission in the first round. The fight also won both men the Fight of the Night bonus award.

Schnell faced Su Mudaerji on July 16, 2022 at UFC on ABC 3. After getting hit and wobbled by multiple flush punches and elbow strikes, Schnell gained top position and came back to win the bout via technical submission with a triangle choke in the second round. This win earned both fighters the Fight of the Night'' bonus award.

Schnell faced Matheus Nicolau on December 3, 2022 at UFC on ESPN 42. He lost the bout via knockout in the second round.

Personal life
Schnell and his wife Morgan have a daughter (born 2020).

Championships and accomplishments
Ultimate Fighting Championship
Performance of the Night (One time) 
 Fight of the Night (Two times) 
Legacy Fighting Alliance
Legacy FC Flyweight champion (one time; former)

Mixed martial arts record

|-
|Loss
|align=center|16–7 (1)
|Matheus Nicolau
|KO (punches)
|UFC on ESPN: Thompson vs. Holland
|
|align=center|2
|align=center|1:44
|Orlando, Florida, United States
|
|-
|Win
|align=center|16–6 (1)
|Su Mudaerji
|Technical Submission (triangle choke)
|UFC on ABC: Ortega vs. Rodríguez
|
|align=center|2
|align=center|4:24
|Elmont, New York, United States
|
|-
|Loss
|align=center|15–6 (1)
|Brandon Royval
|Submission (guillotine choke)
|UFC 274
|
|align=center|1
|align=center|2:14
|Phoenix, Arizona, United States
|
|-
| NC
|align=center|15–5 (1)
|Rogério Bontorin
|NC (overturned)
|UFC 262
|
|align=center|3
|align=center|5:00
|Houston, Texas, United States
|
|-
|Win
|align=center|15–5
|Tyson Nam
|Decision (split)
|UFC on ESPN: Chiesa vs. Magny 
|
|align=center|3
|align=center|5:00
|Abu Dhabi, United Arab Emirates
|  
|-
|Loss
|align=center|14–5
|Alexandre Pantoja
|KO (punches)
|UFC Fight Night: Edgar vs. The Korean Zombie 
|
|align=center|1
|align=center|4:17
|Busan, South Korea
|   
|-
|Win
|align=center|14–4
|Jordan Espinosa
|Submission (triangle choke)
|UFC on ESPN: Covington vs. Lawler
|
|align=center|1
|align=center|1:23
|Newark, New Jersey, United States
|
|-
|Win
|align=center|13–4
|Louis Smolka
|Submission (triangle choke)
|UFC Fight Night: Lewis vs. dos Santos 
|
|align=center|1
|align=center|3:18
|Wichita, Kansas, United States
|
|-
|Win
|align=center|12–4
|Naoki Inoue
|Decision (split)
|UFC Fight Night: Cowboy vs. Edwards
|
|align=center|3
|align=center|5:00
|Kallang, Singapore
|
|-
|Win
|align=center|11–4
|Marco Beltrán
|Decision (unanimous)
|UFC 216 
|
|align=center|3
|align=center|5:00
|Las Vegas, Nevada, United States
|
|-
|Loss
|align=center|10–4
|Hector Sandoval
|KO (punches)
|UFC Fight Night: Swanson vs. Lobov
|
|align=center|1
|align=center|4:24
|Nashville, Tennessee, United States
|
|-
|Loss
|align=center|10–3
|Rob Font
|KO (knee and punches)
|The Ultimate Fighter: Tournament of Champions Finale
|
|align=center|1
|align=center|3:47
|Las Vegas, Nevada, United States
|
|-
|Win
|align=center|10–2
|Klayton Mai
|Submission (armbar)
|Legacy FC 52
|
|align=center|1
|align=center|2:14
|Lake Charles, Louisiana, United States
|
|-
|Win
|align=center|9–2
|Jonathan Martinez
|DQ (illegal knee)
|Legacy FC 49
|
|align=center|2
|align=center|2:21
|Bossier City, Louisiana, United States
|
|-
|Win
|align=center|8–2
|Vanderlei Carvalho Leite
|KO (punches)
|Legacy FC 42
|
|align=center|1
|align=center|0:19
|Lake Charles, Louisiana, United States
|
|-
|Win
|align=center|7–2
|Albert Tapia	
|Submission (armbar)
|Legacy FC: Legacy Kickboxing 2
|
|align=center|2
|align=center|3:19
|Shreveport, Louisiana, United States
|
|-
|Win
|align=center|6–2
|Chris Myers
|Submission (guillotine choke)
|Caged Warrior Championship 6 
|
|align=center|1
|align=center|0:17
|Houma, Louisiana, United States
|
|-
|Win
|align=center|5–2
|Thomas Coleman
|Submission (inverted triangle choke)
|Summit FC 10
|
|align=center|1
|align=center|N/A
|Tupelo, Mississippi, United States
|
|-
|Win
|align=center|4–2
|Latral Perdue
|KO (punch)
|GFA 27: The Stage
|
|align=center|1
|align=center|N/A
|Bossier City, Louisiana, United States
|
|-
|Loss
|align=center|3–2
|Klayton Mai
|Submission (guillotine choke)
|Legacy FC 32
|	
|align=center|2
|align=center|1:24
|Bossier City, Louisiana, United States
|
|-
|Win
|align=center|3–1
|Roger Reyes
|Submission (guillotine choke)
|WFC 17: Battle at the Belle
|
|align=center|1
|align=center|1:26
|Baton Rouge, Louisiana, United States
|
|-
|Loss
|align=center|2–1
|Elias Garcia
|Decision (majority)
|Legacy FC 20
|
|align=center|3
|align=center|5:00
|Corpus Christi, Texas, United States
|
|-
|Win
|align=center|2–0
|Marcus Dupar
|Submission (armbar)
|Legacy FC 15
|
|align=center|1
|align=center|1:06
|Houston, Texas, United States,
|
|-
|Win
|align=center|1–0
|Ryan Hollis
|Decision (split)
|Legacy FC 14
|
|align=center|3
|align=center|5:00
|Houston, Texas, United States,
|
|-

Mixed martial arts exhibition record

|-
|Loss
|align=center|1–1
| Tim Elliott
| Submission (guillotine choke)
| rowspan=2| The Ultimate Fighter: Tournament of Champions
| 
|align=center|1
|align=center|3:26
| rowspan=2|Las Vegas, Nevada, United States
|
|-
|Win
|align=center|1–0
| Matt Rizzo
| Submission (triangle choke)
| 
|align=center|2
|align=center|2:04
|

See also
 List of current UFC fighters
 List of male mixed martial artists

References

External links
 
 

1984 births
Living people
American male mixed martial artists
Flyweight mixed martial artists
Mixed martial artists utilizing karate
Mixed martial artists utilizing Brazilian jiu-jitsu
People from Amory, Mississippi
Mixed martial artists from Mississippi
Ultimate Fighting Championship male fighters
Participants in American reality television series
American male karateka
American practitioners of Brazilian jiu-jitsu